Daphnia catawba is a species of water flea found in northeastern North America.

References 

Freshwater crustaceans of North America
Crustaceans described in 1926
Cladocera